Ermanno Nogler (4 November 1921 – 23 June 2000) was an Italian alpine skier and coach. He finished 42nd in the slalom at the 1952 Winter Olympics in Oslo. After retiring from skiing he coached the national Italian team. His trainees included slalom world champion Carlo Senoner. Around 1968, while working in Sweden, Nogler "discovered" the talented young Swedish skier Ingemar Stenmark, and eventually served as coach for Stenmark during his entire career.

References

External links
 

1921 births
2000 deaths
People from Urtijëi
Italian male alpine skiers
Olympic alpine skiers of Italy
Alpine skiers at the 1952 Winter Olympics
Sportspeople from Südtirol
Italian alpine skiing coaches